Rhett Anthony Bernstein (born September 10, 1987) is an American  former soccer player. In 2009, he won the Hermann Trophy. He played for  Sevilla FC Puerto Rico, Mjøndalen, and Miami FC.

Early and personal life
Bernstein was born in San Diego, California, and is Jewish. As a teenager, he played soccer for the La Jolla Nomads. He attended University City High School in San Diego.

Club career
While playing soccer at Brown University, Bernstein was named to the 2008 Jewish Sports Review All-America First-Team, along with Zac MacMath and Daniel Steres. He was nominated twice for the Hermann Trophy, given to the best male college soccer player in America. In 2009, he won the Hermann Trophy.

He played for Team USA at the 2009 Maccabiah Games in Israel. The team finished fifth in the Games.

After graduating from Brown in 2009, Bernstein spent time in Israel, training with Maccabi Tel Aviv F.C.

Bernstein joined Sevilla FC Puerto Rico to participate in the SúperCopa DirecTV 2010 before moving to Europe.

Bernstein joined Mjøndalen's first-team squad ahead of the 2011 season. He scored his first goals for Mjøndalen against Tromsø on May 9, 2015. They won the game 4–3. Bernstein led Mjøndalen in scoring in 2015 with 5 goals from his center back position, which was also the most goals of all defenders in the Tippligaen.

After five years in Norway, Bernstein signed with expansion Miami FC ahead of the 2016 North American Soccer League season. He chose uniform number 18, saying: "I want to wear number 18, Chai, meaning life [in Hebrew] to express both my strong Jewish identity as well as a long career with Miami FC."

Career statistics

See also
List of select Jewish football (association; soccer) players

References

1987 births
Living people
American soccer players
American expatriate soccer players
Jewish American sportspeople
Maccabiah Games competitors for the United States
Maccabiah Games footballers
Competitors at the 2009 Maccabiah Games
Mjøndalen IF players
Miami FC players
Eliteserien players
Norwegian First Division players
North American Soccer League players
Soccer players from San Diego
American expatriate sportspeople in Norway
Expatriate footballers in Norway
Association football defenders
21st-century American Jews